Gehling's Theatre is a historic three-story building in Falls City, Nebraska. It was built with red bricks in 1892–1893, with a 78 feet long and 50 feet wide auditorium and a 25 feet wide and 24 feet high proscenium inside. It was named for the original owners, the Gehlings, who also owned a brewery. Silent movies, minstrel shows and performances were shown in the theatre. The building has been listed on the National Register of Historic Places since September 28, 1988.

References

National Register of Historic Places in Richardson County, Nebraska
Theatres completed in 1892
Theatres on the National Register of Historic Places in Nebraska